Steen Hansen is a Danish curler.

Teams

Men's

Mixed

References

External links
 

Living people
Danish male curlers
Danish curling champions
Year of birth missing (living people)